The 2012 Tour of Turkey was the 48th edition of the Presidential Cycling Tour of Turkey cycling stage race. It was held from 22 April–29 April 2012, and was rated as a 2.HC event on the UCI Europe Tour. Bulgarian Ivailo Gabrovski originally won the race after dominating the third stage, but was later found to have used EPO and was disqualified.

Teams and cyclists
There are 25 teams in the 2012 Tour of Turkey. Among them were 9 UCI ProTeams, 14 UCI Professional Continental teams, and 2 Continental teams. Each team was allowed eight riders on their squad, giving the event a peloton of 194 cyclists at its outset.

UCI ProTour Teams
 
 
 
 
 
 
 
 
 

UCI Professional Continental Teams
 
 
 
 
 
 
 
 
 
 
 
 
 
 

UCI Continental Teams
 Salcano – Arnavutköy Cycling Team
 Konya – Torku Seker Spor

Stages

Stage 1
22 April 2012 – Alanya, 

A huge crash decimated about half the field with a few kilometers to go. Some riders had to withdraw from the race due to injuries. As per the UCI rules, since the crash occurred less than 3 kilometers away from the finish, all riders caught in the accident were credited the same time as the winner.

Stage 2
23 April 2012 – Alanya to Antalya,  

A breakaway formed at kilometer 48 composed of Alexander Vinokourov, Laurent Pichon, Paolo Locatelli, László Bodrogi and Matteo Fedi. They were caught with 5 kilometers to go, leading to a mass sprint finish.

Stage 3
24 April 2012 – Antalya to Elmalı, 

Bulgarian Ivailo Gabrovski accelerated 8 kilometers away from the finish line in the first mountain top finish stage in the race's history. He went on to win solo and took the leader's jersey. A doping test performed after this stage would eventually lead to Gabrovski's disqualification.

Stage 4
25 April 2012 – Fethiye to Marmaris, 

The mass sprint was very close with Mark Renshaw taking the win over fellow Australian Matthew Goss by a margin that was impossible to distinguish with the naked eye.

Stage 5
26 April 2012 – Marmaris to Turgutreis, 

First professional victory for 23-year-old Andrea Di Corrado, who dropped his 5 breakaway companions to solo his way to the finish line.

Stage 6
27 April 2012 – Bodrum to Kuşadası, 

Gabrovski defended his leader's jersey with the few of his teammates of Konya – Torku Seker Spor who had the resources to help, as they were left in front of the peloton without any help to catch the 3 escapees. They ultimately reeled them in, and a long series of attacks ensued with about 20 kilometers to go, all of which were covered by Gabrovski himself since his team did not have the resources to keep the frantic pace up. Twenty-four-year-old Sacha Modolo won the sprint finish.

Stage 7
28 April 2012 – Kuşadası to İzmir, 

Belgian Iljo Keisse of  won the stage after dropping his 6 breakaway companions with 6 kilometers to go, building a sizable gap with them and the surging peloton. In a finish that was most dramatic, Keisse crashed while negotiating the final bend with 1 km to go. He picked himself up and was almost swept up by the charging bunch, who were on his back wheel as he crossed the finish line.

Stage 8
29 April 2012 – Istanbul, 

They caught the escapees with less than 7 kilometers to go. Theo Bos of  won the sprint after a crash eliminated some top sprinters from the race. Ivailo Gabrovski kept the turquoise jersey and was declared the general classification winner.

Classification leadership

References

Tour of Turkey
Tour of Turkey
Presidential Cycling Tour of Turkey by year